Don't Stop Now – It's Fundation is a BBC Radio 4 show starring Gareth Hale, Norman Pace, Terry Morrison, Joe Griffiths and Victy Silva, with Maryanne Morgan replacing Silva for the third series. It was billed as a non-stop comedy cabaret and comprised a mixture of sketches and humorous songs which were written by the cast along with Charlie Adams and Geoffrey Atkinson. The cast had been performing their material regularly for several years at The Tramshed in Woolwich, South East London as the ensemble Fundation when they were spotted at the Edinburgh Festival by radio producer Alan Nixon.

Recurring sketches included Thirty Second Theatre, Our Fascinating Universe with Rabid Attenborough, Bargain Basement, Falsies: Forged Diaries of the Famous (which spawned a book of the same name written by Hale, Pace and Adams), The Secret Diary of Alien Mole (Aged 13 Million and ¾ Light Years), The Two Rons and Billy and Johnny. The latter two pairings would later become regular characters on the Hale and Pace television series. Joe Griffiths provided accompaniment on the piano for the musical numbers which included the likes of Do You Want Kebab?, Go Reliant Robin, and Do It Yourself.

The show was popular enough with listeners to be recommissioned for three series but it was not necessarily liked by critics.

Series overview

References 

BBC Radio comedy programmes
BBC Radio 4 programmes